Amzi Emmons Zeliff (April 11, 1831 – September 13, 1915) was an American businessman and folk painter.

Little about Zeliff's life is recorded; most of what is known comes from recollections of family members. He was a native of Morris County, New Jersey, the son of Daniel P. and Maria Van Houton Zeliff, and was descended from early Dutch settlers of the state and of Staten Island. He married Cornelia Harris, and may have lived in Essex County for a time. Zeliff was the owner of the White Horse Tavern in Lincoln Park, and lived in the same town, in a house which is said to have had ceiling murals in a floral pattern which he created himself. Only one painting by his hand is identified; this is The Barnyard, currently owned by the National Gallery of Art. Descendants, however, remember other pieces, including pictures of horses as well as a snow scene and a depiction of Queen Victoria. Furthermore, a directory of 1897–1898 published in Morris County lists him as a "painter" by trade. Almost nothing else is known about Zeliff, although his name appears on a list of Commissioners of Deeds for Morris County in 1892, and in a handful of legal records related to a property case involving land.

At his death Zeliff was buried in Paterson, New Jersey.

References

1831 births
1915 deaths
American male painters
19th-century American painters
Painters from New Jersey
People from Lincoln Park, New Jersey
19th-century American businesspeople
20th-century American businesspeople
Businesspeople from New Jersey
Folk artists
19th-century American male artists